MotoGP 18 is a video game developed and published by Milestone srl for PlayStation 4, Xbox One, and Microsoft Windows.

Features
After announcing MotoGP18 is to be released on June 7, Milestone are proud to reveal some brand-new features included in this year’s game. Set to be a reboot of Milestone’s flagship title, MotoGP18 has been developed starting from scratch: a new engine, enhanced graphics, reworked physics, faithful reproduction of all elements in game and a new compelling career mode are just some of the elements that will make this year’s MotoGP videogame the most immersive and realistic MotoGP experience ever.

Using innovative 3D scanning technology, MotoGP riders’ faces have been introduced in game. In addition, the Drone Scanning System has been used to reproduce all the tracks down to the smallest detail, so that the circuit layouts are now completely true to the real ones.

The physics has been completely reworked: thanks to realistic physics simulation, the game faithfully reproduces all the behavior of bikes for a realistic riding feeling like never before. Performance of the AI has been improved, so each gamer will be able to find the level of difficulty that suits his abilities and riding style.

Connect online with friends: MotoGP ID will show statistics and details on the player’s performance, comparing them with other players online. Spectator mode, allows you to watch other players with different TV style camera angles. Everyone will have the feeling they’re watching a real MotoGP race.

MotoGP18 will feature cut scenes of the MotoGP podium, parc fermé and the starting grid, including the box. There will be standard cut scenes as well as customized ones, reproducing iconic gestures of each MotoGP rider.

In MotoGP18, players play in Career mode, making their own way up the ladder of success and building their reputation. Starting from the minor, players begin their career in the lower category, the Red Bull MotoGP Rookies Cup, with the aim of enhancing your bike, signing to a prestigious team and becoming the new MotoGP champion.

One of the most crucial aspects of a real race is the tire management: in MotoGP18, it will be extremely important to learn how to manage the wear of tires during the race. Gamers will be able to check the state of tires and adapt their driving style in order to maintain good conditions of tires.

MotoGP18 will give players the opportunity to take part in the best motorcycle racing show on earth, featuring all the official content from 2018 MotoGP season, with all riders, official rosters from MotoGP, Moto2™, Moto3™ and Red Bull MotoGP Rookies Cup and all 19 official tracks, including the new Chang International Circuit in Thailand.

Reception 
MotoGP 18 received "mixed or average" reviews, according tor review aggregator Metacritic.

References
MotoGP 18 review

Grand Prix motorcycle racing
Milestone srl games
Grand Prix motorcycle racing video games
Multiplayer and single-player video games
PlayStation 4 games
Racing video games
Video games developed in Italy
Windows games
Xbox One games
Nintendo Switch games
2018 video games
PlayStation 4 Pro enhanced games
Unreal Engine games
Video games set in Argentina
Video games set in Australia
Video games set in Austria
Video games set in the Czech Republic
Video games set in England
Video games set in France
Video games set in Germany
Video games set in Italy
Video games set in Japan
Video games set in Malaysia
Video games set in the Netherlands
Video games set in Qatar
Video games set in Spain
Video games set in Texas
Video games set in Thailand